Scaphophyllum is a genus of plant in family Solenostomataceae. It contains the following species (but this list may be incomplete):
 Scaphophyllum speciosum (Horik.) Inoue

Jungermanniales
Jungermanniales genera
Taxonomy articles created by Polbot